Giorgio Ercolani (21 February 1926 – 17 September 2018) was an Italian sports shooter. He competed in the 50 metre pistol event at the 1960 Summer Olympics.

References

External links
 

1926 births
2018 deaths
Italian male sport shooters
Olympic shooters of Italy
Shooters at the 1960 Summer Olympics
Sportspeople from Rome
20th-century Italian people